Bouquet Reservoir is an artificial lake in the Angeles National Forest of Los Angeles County, California about  west from Palmdale.

The dam is constructed of earthfill and is 190 feet (58 m) tall, measured from the elevation of the original streambed.

The dam was built by the city of Los Angeles and was completed in 1934. Official opening ceremonies were held at noon on March 28, 1934. The reservoir is part of the Los Angeles Aqueduct system, which is where it gets much of its water. Both are owned by the Los Angeles Department of Water and Power. Its purpose is to provide regulation of releases and to store water in case there is an interruption upstream.

See also
List of lakes in California
List of dams and reservoirs in California
Castaic Lake
Dry Canyon Reservoir

References

External links
 
University of California, San Francisco
 

Reservoirs in Los Angeles County, California
Los Angeles Aqueduct
Sierra Pelona Ridge
Santa Clara River (California)
Reservoirs in California
Reservoirs in Southern California